is a Japanese black-and-white Tokusatsu live-action TV drama that aired on MBS from March 7, 1959 to May 28, 1960 for a total of 65 episodes split into five parts

Production
Tetsuwan Atomu was produced for Mainichi Broadcasting System, sponsored by Lotte Corporation, by Matsuzaki Production, founded by Keiji Matsuzaki, who worked with Eiji Tsuburaya as a special effects director before the war and was a Toho producer.

It is the first adaptation of Osamu Tezuka's Mighty Atom (a.k.a. Astro Boy) manga comic book series and predates the 1963 Mighty Atom (Astro Boy) anime.

Plot
The series condenses the original's science fiction elements, more in line with the detective stories of the time, with a focus on fighting gangsters. In the original, the story takes place in the 21st century, but according to Atom's dialogue in the second part finale, the historical background of this series is 1959, the same year as the broadcast.

Reception
Although the series was popular for a year, Tezuka became dissatisfied with the adaptation, saying that it was too far removed from the image of the original work, and this became the driving force behind the production of the first Astro Boy anime a few years later. In addition, when Sōji Ushio approached Tezuka in 1965 to make a live-action Ambassador Magma, Tezuka initially suggested that he make a live-action Big X for this reason.

However, P Productions' live-action Magma received high praise from Tezuka, and the bad impression of live-action adaptations was dispelled, and Tezuka himself considered producing a live-action version of Mighty Atom in 1972.

References

External links
Mighty Atom at allcinema
"Hey everyone, I'm Mighty Atom." 

Astro Boy
1959 Japanese television series debuts
1960 Japanese television series endings
1950s Japanese television series
1960s Japanese television series
Mainichi Broadcasting System original programming
Television shows based on manga
Television shows set in Japan